Piccard is a French surname, a variant form of Picard.

Notable people with this name
Members of the Swiss Piccard family
 Auguste Piccard (1884–1962), physicist, balloonist, hydronaut
 Bertrand Piccard (born 1958), psychiatrist, balloonist, and solar plane pilot
 Don Piccard (1926–2020), balloonist
 Jacques Piccard (1922–2008), hydronaut
 Jean Piccard (1884–1963), organic chemist, balloonist
 Jeannette Piccard (1895–1981), balloonist, teacher, scientist, priest
 Jevon Piccard (1887–1954), journeyman technician

Other notable Piccards
 Eulalie Piccard (fl. 1920s–1940s) Swiss-Russian novelist
 Franck Piccard (born 1965), French skier
 Ian Piccard (born 1968), French skier
 Jules Piccard (1840–1933), Swiss chemist
 Leila Piccard (born 1971), French skier
 Sophie Piccard (1904–1990), Swiss-Russian mathematician
 Ted Piccard (born 1978), French skier

See also
 Auguste Piccard submarine
 Picard (disambiguation)
 Picard (name)
 Pickard, surname
 Piccardo, surname